Be a Man is to be the debut album released by the band Missile Innovation.

Track listing
All words and music by Ryo Owatari. All songs arranged by Missile Innovation, and with Seiji Kameda on Track 3.
 "SUPABADD" – 4:04
 "Here we go!" – 4:05
 "" – 4:27
 "Be a man" – 4:30
 "" – 4:13
 "Flying high" – 3:45
 "777" – 4:47
 "Fit" – 3:36
 "" – 5:01
 "" – 3:46

Personnel
 Ryo Owatari - vocals & guitars
 Hisayoshi Hayashi - drums & Chorus
 Yoshiyasu Hayashi - bass & Chorus

External links
 Be a man at Excite Japan.

2006 debut albums